Charlie "Fess" Johnson (November 21, 1891, Philadelphia – December 13, 1959, New York City) was an American jazz bandleader and pianist.

Johnson led an ensemble called the Paradise Ten, who played at Smalls Paradise from 1925–1935, and recorded five times between 1925 and 1929. Though Johnson was a capable pianist, he rarely soloed on his recordings. The Paradise Ten ensemble included trumpeters Jabbo Smith, Leonard Davis, Sidney DeParis, and Thomas Morris, trombonists Charlie Irvis and Jimmy Harrison, alto saxophonists Benny Carter and Edgar Sampson, and tenor saxophonist Benny Waters. Johnson led the ensemble until 1938; following this he freelanced in various ensembles until he retired owing to health problems in the 1950s.

References
Footnotes

General references

1891 births
1959 deaths
American jazz pianists
American male pianists
American jazz bandleaders
Musicians from Philadelphia
20th-century American conductors (music)
20th-century American pianists
Jazz musicians from Pennsylvania
20th-century American male musicians
American male jazz musicians